Pine Hill is an unincorporated community in the Eldora Township of Surry County, North Carolina, United States.  The community is centered on the intersection of Eldora Road/Quaker Church Road and North Carolina Highway 268.  Prominent landmarks in the community include the Pine Hill Friends Meeting and cemetery.

References

Unincorporated communities in Surry County, North Carolina
Unincorporated communities in North Carolina